Brian Charles Hall (20 November 1937 – 17 September 1997) was a British actor. He is best remembered for his role as hotel chef Terry Hughes in the British sitcom Fawlty Towers.

Career
Hall played many hard-boiled tough guy Cockney roles: his role as the amiable chef Terry in Fawlty Towers was a casting against type. He played leading roles in police drama Softly, Softly: Taskforce (1971–72), crime drama McVicar (1980), and sitcom You Must Be The Husband (1987). He also had several guest-starring roles in The Professionals, The Long Good Friday, The Bill, London's Burning, The Sweeney and Minder in Series 1 episode You Gotta Have Friends. He also played the Dad in Billy Webb's Amazing Story by Steve Attridge (1991 BBC)

Personal life and death
Hall became friends with John Cleese when they appeared together in Fawlty Towers. Some years after the series had finished, Cleese sent Hall a personally signed autographed picture as a joke. Hall wrote back and demanded a "signed Rolls-Royce car" instead. Three days later, one arrived by mail – a children's toy.

Hall died on 17 September 1997, aged 59, after a three-year battle with cancer. Commenting on his friend's death, John Cleese said: "I am very upset. I was particularly fond of Brian and had several conversations with him this year. I admire profoundly the way in which he dealt with his cancer. I do not know where he found the strength." A year before his death, Hall told the Mirror: "Cancer is a bully and I hate bullies. This old boy cancer will get about as much change out of me as all the other bullies I've met – nothing."

Filmography

References

External links
 

1937 births
1997 deaths
Male actors from Brighton
English male film actors
English male television actors
Deaths from cancer in England
20th-century English male actors
British male comedy actors